Rebecca Guarna (fl. 1200), was an Italian physician and surgeon and author. She is one of a number of female physicians known from the Middle Ages. She was one of the women known as the "ladies of Salerno".

Rebecca Guarna was a member of the same Salernitan family as the famous Romuald Guarna, priest, physician and historian. She studied at the University of Salerno and belonged to the minority of female students of her time period.

She was the author of De Urinis (on Urine), De febrius (on Fever) and De embrione (on the embryo): her treatise De Urinis treated the method of diagnosing illness by urine sample.

References

Further reading
 Walsh JJ. 'Medieval Women Physicians' in Old Time Makers of Medicine: The Story of the Students and Teachers of the Sciences Related to Medicine During the Middle Ages, ch. 8, (Fordham University Press; 1911)

Year of birth missing
Year of death missing
Medieval women physicians
13th-century Italian physicians
13th-century Italian women
Italian medical writers
Schola Medica Salernitana
13th-century women writers
13th-century Latin writers
13th-century Italian writers
Medieval surgeons